A de-asphalter is a unit in a crude oil refinery or bitumen upgrader that separates asphalt from crude oil or bitumen. 

The de-asphalter unit is usually placed after the vacuum distillation tower. It is usually a solvent de-asphalter unit, SDA. The SDA separates the asphalt from the feedstock because light hydrocarbons will dissolve aliphatic compounds but not asphaltenes. The output from the de-asphalter unit is de-asphalted oil ("DAO") and asphalt. 

DAO from propane de-asphalting has the highest quality but lowest yield, whereas using pentane may double or triple the yield from a heavy feed, but at the expense of contamination by metals and carbon residues that shorten the life of downstream cracking catalysts. If the solvent is butane the unit will be referred to as a butane de-asphalter ("BDA") and if the solvent is propane, it will be called a propane de-asphalter ("PDA") unit.

References
Study of selected petroleum refining residuals by US EPA
Lubricants and Lubrication (Second Edition)

External links 
Solvent de-asphalting
Solvent de-asphalting of vacuum residuum
Asphalt used for gasification

Chemical equipment
Distillation
Petroleum technology